HDD  may refer to:
 H. D. Deve Gowda, former Prime Minister of India
 Hard disk drive
 Hand Drawn Dracula, a record label
 Head-down display
 Heating degree day
 High definition display
 Honorary Doctor of Divinity
 Horizontal Directional Drilling
 Hyderabad Airport (Sindh) (IATA:HDD), in Pakistan
 ; see Device file § naming conventions
 Hard Drive Divinity, the transformed state of CPUs in Hyperdimension Neptunia
 Handan East railway station, China Railway pinyin code HDD